James Elsworth Peoples (October 8, 1863 in Big Beaver, Michigan – August 29, 1920 in Detroit, Michigan) was a catcher and shortstop in Major League Baseball in the 19th century. He played from 1884 to 1889 in the majors and through 1894 in the minors.

Sources

Baseball Almanac
Encyclopedia of Baseball Catchers

Major League Baseball catchers
Major League Baseball shortstops
19th-century baseball players
Brooklyn Grays players
Brooklyn Bridegrooms players
Cincinnati Red Stockings (AA) players
Columbus Solons players
1863 births
1920 deaths
Erie Blackbirds players
Canton Nadjys players
New Orleans Pelicans (baseball) players
Waterbury (minor league baseball) players
Baseball players from Michigan